Pettyjohn may refer to:

People
Adam Pettyjohn
Angelique Pettyjohn

Other
Pettyjohn, Marion County, West Virginia, an unincorporated community in Marion County